Lucille Elizabeth Davis "Malkia" Roberts (1917–2004) was an American painter and educator.

Life 
Born in Washington, D.C., Roberts earned her bachelor's degree from Howard University and a Master of Fine Arts degree from the University of Michigan. Roberts taught for D.C. public schools throughout her career, including Duke Ellington School for the Arts and Shaw Junior High School, where she taught alongside Alma Thomas for forty years. She held professorships of art and art history at D.C. Teachers College, State University of New York at Oswego, Washington Technical Institute and American University. She traveled extensively during her career, but much of her work was informed by African themes and topics. Roberts also studied with Hale Woodruff and taught at Howard University from 1976 to 1985. She exhibited widely, and her work is represented in numerous private and public collections. According to the artist, she was influenced by her studies: "I have various degrees in Sociology which allow me to inject intellectual themes into my artistry." In addition, her "travels to Africa have greatly influenced [her] style and direction of work."

References

1927 births
2004 deaths
African-American women artists
American women painters
Howard University faculty
Howard University alumni
University of Michigan alumni
Painters from Washington, D.C.
20th-century American painters
21st-century American painters
20th-century American women artists
21st-century American women artists
American women academics
20th-century African-American women
20th-century African-American painters
21st-century African-American women
21st-century African-American artists